Gewobag is a German property company owned by the State of Berlin which plans to own 80,000 apartments by 2030 in order to improve housing affordability.

Gewobag's name comes from a shortening of its former legal name, roughly "Public Housing Construction Corporation of Greater Berlin".

In September 2019 Gewobag bought 6000 apartments, mostly in Spandau and Reinickendorf. The purchase from ADO Properties cost 920 million euros and is considered the largest such purchase of apartments ever for Berlin.

See also
Deutsche Wohnen

References

Real estate companies of Germany
Companies based in Berlin